In the United Kingdom, the average earnings index (AEI) was an indicator of inflationary pressures emanating from the labour market.

The AEI was replaced by the average weekly earnings (AWE) as the lead measure of short-term earnings growth in January 2010.

See also 
 Consumer price index
 Retail price index

References

External links

http://www.ons.gov.uk/ons/rel/awe/average-weekly-earnings/the-development-of-the-average-weekly-earnings-indicator/development-of-the-average-weekly-earnings-indicator.pdf

Price indices
Economy of the United Kingdom
Office for National Statistics